The Padma Bhushan is the third-highest civilian award of the Republic of India. Instituted on 2January 1954, the award is given for "distinguished service of a high order", without distinction of race, occupation, position, or sex. The recipients receive a Sanad, a certificate signed by the President of India and a circular-shaped medallion with no monetary association. The recipients are announced every year on Republic Day (26January) and registered in The Gazette of Indiaa publication used for official government notices and released weekly by the Department of Publication, under the Ministry of Urban Development. The conferral of the award is not considered official without its publication in the Gazette. The names of recipients whose awards have been revoked or restored, both of which processes require the authority of the president, are archived and they are required to surrender their medal when their name is struck from the register; none of the conferments of Padma Bhushan during 2000–2009 have been revoked or restored. The recommendations are received from all the state and the union territory governments, as well as from Ministries of the Government of India, the Bharat Ratna and the Padma Vibhushan awardees, the Institutes of Excellence, the Ministers, the Chief Ministers and the Governors of State, and the Members of Parliament including private individuals.

When instituted in 1954, the Padma Bhushan was classified as "Dusra Varg" (Class II) under the three-tier Padma Vibhushan awards, which were preceded by the Bharat Ratna in hierarchy. On 15January 1955, the Padma Vibhushan was reclassified into three different awards as the Padma Vibhushan, the Padma Bhushan and the Padma Shri. The criteria included "distinguished service of a high order in any field including service rendered by Government servants", but excluded those working with the public sector undertakings with the exception of doctors and scientists. The 1954 statutes did not allow posthumous awards; this was subsequently modified in the January 1955 statute. The centrally placed pattern made of outer lines of a square of  side is embossed with a knob carved within each of the outer angles of the pattern. A raised circular space of diameter  is placed at the centre of the decoration. A centrally located lotus flower is embossed on the obverse side of the medal and the text "Padma" is placed above and the text "Bhushan" is placed below the lotus written in Devanagari script. The State Emblem of India is displayed in the centre of the reverse side, together with the national motto of India, "Satyameva Jayate" (Truth alone triumphs) in Devanagari script, which is inscribed on the lower edge. The rim, the edges and all embossing on either side is of standard gold with the text "Padma Bhushan" of gold gilt. The medal is suspended by a pink riband  in width with a broad white stripe in the middle. It is ranked fifth in the order of precedence of wearing of medals and decorations of the Indian civilian and military awards.

A total of 291 awards were presented in the 2000s twenty awards were presented in 2000, followed by thirty-two in 2001, twenty-five in 2002, thirty-two in 2003, nineteen in 2004, thirty in 2005, thirty-seven in 2006, thirty-two in 2007, thirty-five in 2008, and thirty-one in 2009. The Padma Bhushan in the 2000s was also conferred upon 37 foreign recipients eighteen from the United States, five each from Russia and the United Kingdom, three from Japan, two from France, and one each from China, the Czech Republic, Germany, and South Africa. Individuals from ten different fields were awarded, which includes sixty-nine artists, sixty from literature and education, forty-three from science and engineering, twenty-seven from trade and industry, twenty-six from medicine, twenty-two from public affairs, eighteen from social work, twelve from civil services, ten from other fields, and four sportspersons.

In 2003, Rashtriya Swayamsevak Sangh (RSS) volunteer Dattopant Thengadi refused to accept the award until RSS founder K. B. Hedgewar RSS ideologue M. S. Golwalkar had been offered the Bharat Ratna. Historian Romila Thapar, who had earlier refused the award in 1992, did so again in 2005. In a letter she wrote to the then President A. P. J. Abdul Kalam, she mentioned that she had refused the award when the Ministry of Human Resource Development contacted her. However, she stated she was surprised to see her name in the list of awardees. Civil servant S. R. Sankaran also refused to accept the award in 2005 without citing any reason.

Recipients

Explanatory notes

Non-citizen recipients

Posthumous recipients

References

External links
 
 

Lists of Indian award winners